is a Japanese actor who has appeared in movies and on television.

Matsuzaki appeared in Clint Eastwood's Letters from Iwo Jima and in The Pink Panther 2 where he portrayed Kenji Mazuto, a technology "wiz-kid". He appeared in Pirates of the Caribbean: On Stranger Tides as a character named Garheng. He also starred in the film Man From Reno (2014). He is the voice of Miyamoto Usagi from the 2012 animated series adaptation of Teenage Mutant Ninja Turtles and the 2022 Netflix series Samurai Rabbit: The Usagi Chronicles.

Filmography

Film

Television

Video games

References

External links
 

1981 births
Living people
Actors from Miyazaki Prefecture
Japanese male film actors
Japanese male television actors
Japanese male video game actors
Japanese male voice actors
21st-century Japanese male actors